Sandbore Caye lighthouse is a lighthouse located at the north end of the Lighthouse Reef at   from Belize City, Belize.

History

See also
List of lighthouses in Belize

References

External links
 Picture of Sandbore Caye Lighthouse
 Belize Port Authority

Lighthouses in Belize
Lighthouses completed in 1904